Julio Sáez (born 23 December 1956) is a Spanish weightlifter. He competed in the men's flyweight event at the 1984 Summer Olympics.

References

1956 births
Living people
Spanish male weightlifters
Olympic weightlifters of Spain
Weightlifters at the 1984 Summer Olympics
Sportspeople from Madrid
20th-century Spanish people